Steven John Palframan (born 12 May 1970) is a former South African international cricketer.

Palframan was born in East London, Cape Province.  He played seven One Day Internationals in 1996. He was a wicket-keeper. He also played in the 1996 Cricket World Cup.

He scored 55 runs at the One Day Internationals, with an batting average of 13.75. His highest score was 28.

References

External links

1970 births
Living people
South African cricketers
South Africa One Day International cricketers
Boland cricketers
Border cricketers
Eastern Province cricketers
Wicket-keepers